The Cebuano numbers are the system of number names used in Cebuano to express quantities and other information related to numbers. Cebuano has two number systems: the native system and the Spanish-derived system. The native system is mostly used for counting small numbers, basic measurement, and for other pre-existing native concepts that deals with numbers. Meanwhile, the Spanish-derived system is mainly used for concepts that only existed post-colonially such as counting large numbers, currency, solar time, and advanced mathematics.

History 
Unlike other Philippine languages, the native number system of Cebuano was derived solely from the non-human forms of Proto-Austronesian numerals instead of a combination of both human and non-human numerals, such as in Tagalog and Hiligaynon. The numbers were first recorded by chronicler Antonio Pigafetta during Magellan's expedition.

Types 
The native numbers are categorized into four types: cardinal, ordinal, distributive, and multiplicative (also referred to as "viceral" or "adverbial"). The multiples of ten are formed by attaching the circumfix "ka-ø-an" (e.g. kawaloan). Those that are within the 20-60 range undergo the process of metathesis and syncope (e.g. katloan, from katuloan).

Cardinal 

Like other Visayan languages, cardinal numbers are linked to the noun with the ligature ka.

 usa ka tawo a/one person
 kaluhaan ug usa ka bulan twenty-one months

Ordinal 
Ordinal numbers in Cebuano are formed using the ika- prefix, except una.

Distributive 
Distributive numbers in Cebuano are formed by attaching the tag- prefix to the numerical root. Irregular words may be formed depending on the number being attached to.

Multiplicative 
Multiplicative (or viceral) numbers in Cebuano are formed using the ka- prefix. The prefixes "naka-" and "maka-" may also be used to specify if the number is used in the nasugdan or pagasugdan aspect, respectively.

See also
Cebuano language
Cebuano grammar

References 

Cebuano language
Numbers